Laetesia nornalupiensis is a species of sheet weaver spider found in Western Australia. It was described by Wunderlich in 1976.

References

Linyphiidae
Spiders of Australia
Arthropods of Western Australia
Spiders described in 1976